The John Gillin Residence is a large single-story Usonian house, designed by Frank Lloyd Wright in 1950 and built in Dallas, Texas, in 1958. The Gillin House is Wright's only residential project in Dallas. Gillin, a successful oilman, geophysicist and electronics "gadgeteer", commissioned Wright to design a work of art that would also be suitable for living and entertaining. A self-made man, Wright respected him and allowed him to design many details including all door hardware, the stainless steel kitchenettes and even the diving board support.

This sprawling Usonian is one of Wright's most extensive single-story residences. Three wings spin off a central hexagon much as might have happened had Wingspread been based on an equilateral parallelogram rather than a square. The home is organized around a massive angular fireplace. The acute angles of 60 and 120 degrees give intimacy to the rooms with ample light-filled space and volume that is unusual for a Frank Lloyd Wright designed home. The grand living room is under a hexagonal copper dome roof and ventilator specifically copied from the Arizona Biltmore Hotel's Aztec ballroom. 

The home was designed in response to the south central prairie's climate and its site of seven acres overlooking a creek. Long horizontal outer walls of understated native sandstone and horizontal bands of windows converge to create a dramatic entry.

In 1996, the Gillin House was featured as Bob Mapplethorpe's house in the Wes Anderson film, Bottle Rocket.

References

 Storrer, William Allin. The Frank Lloyd Wright Companion. University Of Chicago Press, 2006,  (S.338)

External links
Details of the house and interior from owner
Gillin House on waymarking.com
Frank Lloyd Wright - Preston Hollow Modern Home
Big houses in Big D
Photo of the Gillin House
Photos on Arcaid

Frank Lloyd Wright buildings
Houses in Dallas
Buildings and structures completed in 1958
1948 establishments in Texas